The Saint-Germain Cemetery (cimetière Saint-Germain) or Saint-Pierre Cemetery (cimetière Saint-Pierre) was a rectangular cemetery in Paris, first attested in  and used by Protestants from 1598 to 1604 onwards. It was sited in the north-west corner of the former rue Taranne and rue des Saints-Pères, alongside the chapelle des Saint-Pères (on the site now occupied by square de la Charité at 186 boulevard Saint-Germain. It measured 27 toise by 8 toise. Its site is now covered by Square Taras-Chevtchenko.

Owned by the parish of Saint-Sulpice, it was used for plague victims and lepers until 1544. Article 45 of the Edict of Nantes noted it as one of two Protestant cemeteries in Paris (the other was La Trinité Cemetery). The parish council required them to leave it in 1604 and they moved to the nearby Saints-Pères Cemetery. The Hôpital de la Charité briefly used the cemetery from 1604 to 1609.

Notable burials
 Claude Arnauld, un conseiller, notary and secretary to Henri IV, treasurer general to the généralité de Paris, died  1603.
 Monsieur de Rambouillet, one of the secretaries of Henri IV, died 1602.

References

Bibliography (in French)
 Les cimetières protestants
  Les deux cents cimetières du Vieux Paris par Jacques Hillairet
   L'Oratoire du Louvre et les protestants parisiens par Philippe Braunstein
   Les morts, l'Église et l'État Par Jacqueline Thibaut-Payen
 Dictionnaire historique des rues de Paris by Jacques Hillairet
   Le cimetière Saint-Germain sur tombes-sepultures.com

External links
 

Protestant Reformed cemeteries
Cemeteries in Paris
6th arrondissement of Paris
History of Protestantism in France
Former cemeteries